The 1992 PBA All-Star Game is the annual all-star weekend of the Philippine Basketball Association (PBA). The events were held on May 24, 1992, at The ULTRA in Pasig, coinciding the league's 1992 season.

This is also the first All-Star game that featured skills challenge.

Skills challenge

Three-point shootout

Slam Dunk competition

All-Star Game

Rosters

North All-Stars:
Samboy Lim (San Miguel)
Ato Agustin (San Miguel)
Paul Alvarez (Alaska)
Vergel Meneses (Presto)
Allan Caidic (Presto)
Robert Jaworski (Ginebra)
Chito Loyzaga (Ginebra)
Ronnie Magsanoc (Shell)
Benjie Paras (Shell)
Alvin Patrimonio (Purefoods)
Jerry Codiñera (Purefoods)
Manny Victorino (Pepsi)
Coach: Robert Jaworski (Ginebra)

South All-Stars:
Dondon Ampalayo (Ginebra)
Dante Gonzalgo (Ginebra)
Pido Jarencio (Ginebra)
Nelson Asaytono (Swift)
Alfonso Solis (Swift)
Boy Cabahug (Purefoods)
Dindo Pumaren (Purefoods)
Romeo dela Rosa (Shell)
Abet Guidaben (Pepsi)
Jojo Lastimosa (Alaska)
Zaldy Realubit (Presto)
Alvin Teng (San Miguel)
Coach: Tim Cone (Alaska)

Game

References

All-Star Game
Philippine Basketball Association All-Star Weekend